Bartolomeu Jacinto Quissanga, known as Bastos (born 23 November 1991), is an Angolan professional footballer who plays as a centre-back for Saudi Arabian club Al-Ahli.

Club career

Bastos began his career in his native country Angola. Between 2011 and 2013 he played with Petro Atlético de Luanda in 105 games where he scored 6 goals and also won the Taça de Angola twice.

Rostov

On 11 July 2013, Bastos signed a three-year contract with Russian Premier League side FC Rostov. He played a key role in winning the first Russian Cup for his club Rostov in the final against FC Krasnodar.

Lazio

On 17 August 2016, Lazio announced the signing of Bastos for €5 million. He scored his first goal for the club on 17 September 2017, a 3–2 away win over Genoa.

Al-Ain
On 22 October 2020, after playing in two of Lazio's opening matches of the 2020–21 Serie A season, Bastos joined Saudi club Al-Ain on a permanent basis.

Rostov loan
On 5 August 2021, Bastos returned to Rostov on loan for the 2021–22 season. 

On 24 February 2022, the Russian invasion of Ukraine began, with the airports based in the provinces that were close to Ukraine were ordered closed until 2 March, including Platov International Airport in Rostov-on-Don. On 7 March 2022, FIFA announced that foreign players in Russia would be able to unilaterally suspend their contracts with their clubs until 30 June 2022 and sign with a club outside of Russia until 30 June 2022. Bastos made use of the rule alongside fellow Rostov teammates Dennis Hadžikadunić, Armin Gigović, Pontus Almqvist and Magnus Nordengen Knudsen, all of whom left on special leave for various European clubs. Bastos had reached an agreement with Bundesliga club Arminia Bielefeld. However, on 17 March 2022, the German Football Association (DFB) announced that the transfer window in Germany would not be re-opened and players from the Russian and Ukrainian leagues would not be allowed to be registered in official national competitions to "maintain the sporting integrity of the competitions", despite FIFA giving permission to do so.

Despite his transfer being blocked by the DFB, Bastos suspension was upheld and he would not make another appearance for Rostov during the 2021–22 season.

Al-Ahli
On 8 September 2022, Bastos joined Saudi Arabian club Al-Ahli on a free transfer.

International career
Bastos debuted for his country in a 0–0 draw against Liberia on 10 August 2011. He represented Angola at the 2013 Africa Cup of Nations.

Personal life
In November 2016, Bastos' younger brother Nandinho signed for Rostov.

Career statistics

Club

International

Scores and results list Angola's goal tally first.

Honours
Rostov
Russian Cup: 2013–14
Lazio
Coppa Italia: 2018–19
Supercoppa Italiana: 2019
Angola
Four Nations Tournament bronze medal: 2018

References

External links

 
 

1991 births
Living people
Association football defenders
Angolan footballers
Angola international footballers
2013 Africa Cup of Nations players
2019 Africa Cup of Nations players
Atlético Petróleos de Luanda players
FC Rostov players
S.S. Lazio players
Al-Ain FC (Saudi Arabia) players
Al-Ahli Saudi FC players
Angolan expatriate footballers
Russian Premier League players
Serie A players
Saudi Professional League players
Saudi First Division League players
Expatriate footballers in Russia
Angolan expatriate sportspeople in Russia
Expatriate footballers in Italy
Angolan expatriate sportspeople in Italy
Expatriate footballers in Saudi Arabia
Footballers from Luanda